Persinger is an unincorporated community in Nicholas County, West Virginia, United States.

The community most likely was named after nearby Persinger Creek.

References

Unincorporated communities in Nicholas County, West Virginia
Unincorporated communities in West Virginia